Andwell Priory is an alien priory of Benedictine monks in Andwell, Hampshire, England.

This small priory was founded as a cell of the great Benedictine abbey of Tiron in the twelfth century by Adam de Port of nearby Mapledurwell. The grant of lands in Up Nately and other rents were confirmed by a charter of King Henry I of England.

William of Wykeham, Bishop of Winchester, purchased Andwell from the abbey of Tiron in the later part of the reign of Richard II and bestowed it and its lands on his newly founded college at Winchester, to which it still belongs.

The premises were very small and not much remains. The north, west and east flint walls of the church survive, as do two modest 14th century doorways that were part of the west range.

References

External links
A History of the County of Hampshire: Volume 2, The Victoria County History 1973
 The Buildings of England: Hampshire and the Isle of Wight, Nikolaus Pevsner and David Lloyd

Benedictine monasteries in England
Priories in Hampshire
Alien priories in England
12th-century establishments in England